Islam is the third most widely professed religion in North Ossetia–Alania.

While the majority of Ossetians are Christian (predominantly Eastern Orthodox) and professing their ancestral faith Uatsdin, according to official estimates, 30 percent of the population of North Ossetia–Alania is Muslim (predominantly Sunni) (most of them are not ethnic Ossetians but Ingush and other).

History  
The Digor in the west came under Kabard and Islamic influence. It was through the Kabardians (an East Circassian tribe) that Islam was introduced into North Ossetia – Alania in the 17th century.

Islam today 

The Ossetian capital of Vladikavkaz houses the Mukhtarov Mosque, built in the beginning of the 20th century. Money for the construction of the mosque was donated by the Azerbaijani tycoon  Murtuza Mukhtarov. The mosque was built in the Egyptian style and has no architectural analogies in the North Caucasus. After the Bolshevik Revolution in 1917, Islam, like all other religions in the Soviet Union, was suppressed and many mosques and Muslim theological schools were closed. It was only after the collapse of the Soviet Union that a massive religious revival occurred. Islam began to be practiced more openly.

See also 
 Islam in Russia
 Islam in South Ossetia

References

External links 
 The Role of Islam in North Ossetia

North Ossetia–Alania
North Ossetia–Alania
Culture of North Ossetia–Alania
North Ossetia